This article serves as an index - as complete as possible - of all the honorific orders or similar decorations received by the Terengganu Royal Family, classified by continent, awarding country and recipient.

The Sultan of Terengganu and members of the Sultan's family have received many honours from different states of Malaysia and from other nations.

Sultanate of Terengganu 

They have been awarded:

 Sultan Mizan Zainal Abidin of Terengganu :
  Grand Master and recipient of the Supreme Royal Family Order of Terengganu (DKT, since 15 May 1998)
  Founding Grand Master and recipient of the Royal Family Order of Terengganu (DKR, 6 July 2000)
  First Class (DK I, 9 March 1981) and Grand Master (since 15 May 1998) of the Family Order of Terengganu 
 Order of Sultan Mizan Zainal Abidin of Terengganu : 
  Founding Grand Master and Knight Grand Companion (SSMZ, 6 July 2001)
  Funding Supreme class (SUMZ, 26.5.2005) 
  Member Grand Companion (SSMT, 12 Feb. 1989) and Grand Master (since 15 May 1998) of the Order of Sultan Mahmud I of Terengganu
  Knight Grand Commander (SPMT, 6 March 1982) and Grand Master (since 15 May 1998) of the Order of the Crown of Terengganu
Sultanah Nur Zahirah :
  First Class of the Family Order of Terengganu (DK I, 16.1.1999)
  Knight Grand Companion of the Order of Sultan Mizan Zainal Abidin of Terengganu (SSMZ, 6.7.2001)
  Member Grand Companion of the Order of Sultan Mahmud I of Terengganu (SSMT, 9.7.1998)
Tengku Muhammad Ismail, Heir Apparent :
  Member of the Royal Family Order of Terengganu (DKR, 14.12.2011) 
  First Class of the Family Order of Terengganu (DK I,12.12.2006)
  Knight Grand Companion of the Order of Sultan Mizan Zainal Abidin of Terengganu (SSMZ)
 Y.T.M. Tengku Dato’ Mustafa Kamil, Tengku Sri Bendahara Raja (Sultan's 1st younger brother) :
  Second Class (DK II)
  Member Grand Companion of the Order of Sultan Mahmud I of Terengganu (SSMT, 29.4.1991)
 Y.T.M. Tengku Dato’ Sri Badr ul-Zaman, Tengku Sri Panglima Raja (Sultan's 2nd younger brother) :
  Second Class (DK II)
  Member Grand Companion of the Order of Sultan Mahmud I of Terengganu (SSMT)
 Y.A.M. Tengku Dato’ Badr ul-Hisham [Bahar ud-din], Tengku Sri Temenggong Raja (Sultan's 3rd younger brother) :
  Second Class (DK II)
  Member Grand Companion of the Order of Sultan Mahmud I of Terengganu (SSMT)
 Y.A.M. Dato’ Hajjah Tengku Amira Zahara Farah Qurashiyah , Tengku Kamala Putri (Sultan's elder sister) :
  Second Class (DK II)
  Member Grand Companion of the Order of Sultan Mahmud I of Terengganu (SSMT)
 Y.A.M. Tengku Nur Rohana Fathia Putri [Tengku Ana] (Sultan's 1st younger sister) :
  Second Class (DK II)
  Member Grand Companion of the Order of Sultan Mahmud I of Terengganu (SSMT)
 Y.A.M. Tengku Dato’ Rahima Putri (Sultan's 2nd younger sister) :
  Second Class (DK II)
  Member Grand Companion of the Order of Sultan Mahmud I of Terengganu (SSMT)

Malaysia, sultanates and states

Malaysia 

They have been awarded :

 Sultan Mizan Zainal Abidin of Terengganu (as Yang di-Pertuan Agong from 13 December 2006 until 12 December 2011) :
  Grand Master (2006-2011) and Recipient (DKM, 5.4.2007) of the Order of the Royal House of Malaysia 
   Recipient (DMN, 27 February 1999) and Grand Master (2006-2011) of the Order of the Crown of the Realm
  Grand Commander (SMN, 27.2.1999) and Grand Master (2006-2011) of the Order of the Defender of the Realm
  Grand Master of the Order of Loyalty to the Crown of Malaysia (2006-2011) 
   Grand Master of the Order of Merit of Malaysia (2006-2011) 
  Grand Master of the Order for Important Services (Malaysia) (2006-2011) 
  Grand Master of the Order of the Royal Household (2006-2011)
 Sultanah Nur Zahirah :
  Order of the Crown of the Realm  (DMN, 5.4.2007, as Consort of the Yang di-Pertuan Agong)
 Y.A.M. Dato’ Hajjah Tengku Amira Zahara Farah Qurashiyah , Tengku Kamala Putri (Sultan Mizan Zainal Abidin's elder sister) :
According to Royal Ark : DMN (27.2.1999) but it is strange as she is not a ruler's wife, so maybe PMN ...
 either  Recipient of the Order of the Crown of the Realm (DMN, 27.2.1999)  
 or  Commander of the Order of the Defender of the Realm (PMN, 27.2.1999)

Sultanate of Johor 
 Sultan Mizan Zainal Abidin of Terengganu (Sultan : since 15 May 1998 - Y.d-P.A. : 12/2006-12/2011):
  First Class of the Royal Family Order of Johor (DK, 8 April 1986)
  Knight Grand Commander of the Order of the Crown of Johor (SPMJ, 8 April 1986)

Sultanate of Kedah 

 Sultan Mizan Zainal Abidin of Terengganu (Sultan : since 15 May 1998 - Y.d-P.A. : 12/2006-12/2011):
  Member of the Royal Family Order of Kedah (DK, 21.1.2002)
 Sultanah Nur Zahirah : 
  Member of the Royal Family Order of Kedah (DK)

Sultanate of Kelantan 

 Sultan Mizan Zainal Abidin of Terengganu (Sultan : since 15 May 1998 - Y.d-P.A. : 12/2006-12/2011):
  Recipient of the Royal Family Order or Star of Yunus (DK, 30.3.2002)

Sultanate of Negeri Sembilan 

 Sultan Mizan Zainal Abidin of Terengganu (Sultan : since 15 May 1998 - Y.d-P.A. : 12/2006-12/2011):
  Member of the Royal Family Order of Negeri Sembilan (DKNS, 19.7.2001)

Sultanate of Pahang 

 Y.T.M. Tengku Dato’ Mustafa Kamil, Tengku Sri Bendahara Raja (Sultan Mizan Zainal Abidin's 1st younger brother):
  Grand Knight (or Datuk Sri) of the Order of the Crown of Pahang (SIMP, 26.10.2003)

Sultanate of Perak 

 Sultan Mizan Zainal Abidin of Terengganu (Sultan : since 15 May 1998 - Y.d-P.A. : 12/2006-12/2011):
  Recipient of the Royal Family Order of Perak (DK)

Sultanate of Perlis 

 Sultan Mizan Zainal Abidin of Terengganu (Sultan : since 15 May 1998 - Y.d-P.A. : 12/2006-12/2011):
  Recipient of the Perlis Family Order of the Gallant Prince Syed Putra Jamalullail (DK, 28 May 1998)

Sultanate of Selangor 

 Sultan Mizan Zainal Abidin of Terengganu (Sultan : since 15 May 1998 - Y.d-P.A. : 12/2006-12/2011):
  First Class of the Royal Family Order of Selangor (DK, 10.4.2003)

Asian honours

Far East

Brunei 
See also List of Bruneian Honours awarded to Heads of State and Royals

 Sultan Mizan Zainal Abidin of Terengganu (Sultan : since 15 May 1998 - Y.d-P.A. : 12/2006-12/2011):
 Recipient of the Royal Family Order of the Crown of Brunei (DKMB)

Indonesia 
 Sultan Mizan Zainal Abidin of Terengganu (Sultan : since 15 May 1998 - Y.d-P.A. : 12/2006-12/2011):
 First class (or Adipurna) of the Order of the Republic of Indonesia (17.10.2011)

Thailand 
See also List of Thai Honours awarded to Heads of State and Royals

 Sultan Mizan Zainal Abidin of Terengganu (Sultan : since 15 May 1998 - Y.d-P.A. : 12/2006-12/2011):
 Knight of the Order of Rajamitrabhorn (9.3. 2009)
 Sultanah Nur Zahirah : 
 Grand Cordon Of the Order of Chula Chom Klao

Middle East

Qatar 
 Sultan Mizan Zainal Abidin of Terengganu (Sultan : since 15 May 1998 - Y.d-P.A. : 12/2006-12/2011):
 Grand Cordon of the Order of Independence of Qatar (13.12.2010)

To be completed if any other ...

American  honours

Chile 
 Sultan Mizan Zainal Abidin of Terengganu (Sultan : since 15 May 1998 - Y.d-P.A. : 12/2006-12/2011):
 Grand Cross with Collar of the Order of the Merit of Chile

To be completed if any other ...

European honours

France 
Sultan Mizan Zainal Abidin of Terengganu (Sultan : since 15 May 1998 - Y.d-P.A. 12/2006-12/2011):
 Commander of the National Order of the Legion of Honour

To be completed if any other ...

African honours

To be completed if any ...

References

Notes

 
Terengganu